Mohammed Adiq Husainie Othman (born 29 April 1991) is a Malaysian professional racing cyclist, who last rode for UCI Continental team .  He competed for Malaysia at the 2012 Olympic Games, in the men's road race.  He also competed at the 2010 and 2018 Commonwealth Games, in track cycling.

Major results

2007
 3rd Overall Tour of Terengganu
2008
 1st  Road race, National Junior Road Championships
 3rd  Time trial, Asian Junior Road Championships
2009
 Asian Junior Cycling Championships
2nd  Road race
3rd  Madison
3rd  Scratch
 3rd  Scratch, UCI Juniors Track World Championships
2010
 1st  Road race, National Road Championships
 7th Overall Jelajah Malaysia
2011
 Southeast Asian Games
1st  Team pursuit
2nd  Points race
 1st Stage 6 Tour de Korea
 1st  Mountains classification Jelajah Malaysia
 2nd Overall Tour de Brunei
1st Stage 1
 3rd  Points race, Asian Track Championships
 9th Overall Tour of Hainan
2012
 2nd  Road race, Asian Under-23 Road Championships
 6th Overall Jelajah Malaysia
1st  Points classification
 10th Overall Tour de Taiwan
2013
 3rd  Team time trial, Southeast Asian Games
 3rd Road race, National Road Championships
 4th Overall Jelajah Malaysia
 9th Road race, Asian Under-23 Road Championships
2014
 7th Overall Sharjah International Cycling Tour
 8th Overall Jelajah Malaysia
2015
 5th Time trial, Southeast Asian Games
2016
 1st  Asian rider classification Tour de Langkawi
2017
 1st Stage 2 Jelajah Malaysia
 8th Road race, Southeast Asian Games

References

External links
 
 

1991 births
Living people
Malaysian male cyclists
Malaysian people of Malay descent
Malaysian Muslims
People from Terengganu
Cyclists at the 2012 Summer Olympics
Olympic cyclists of Malaysia
Cyclists at the 2010 Commonwealth Games
Cyclists at the 2010 Asian Games
Southeast Asian Games medalists in cycling
Southeast Asian Games gold medalists for Malaysia
Southeast Asian Games silver medalists for Malaysia
Southeast Asian Games bronze medalists for Malaysia
Competitors at the 2011 Southeast Asian Games
Asian Games competitors for Malaysia
Cyclists at the 2018 Commonwealth Games
Commonwealth Games competitors for Malaysia
21st-century Malaysian people